Spilia Museum of Kissamos is a museum in Kissamos, Crete, Greece.

External links

 http://xaniavillas.com/aboutchania/museums-sights.pdf  Listing of a "Byzantine and Folklore Museum of Spilia, Kissamos"
 http://www.beeinnet.com/266/En/Destination-Info/Chania/spilia-kissamos.aspx "Just as remarkable is the small museum of religious art in the centre of the village"
 No more information about this topic could be found in Greek or English.

Buildings and structures in Chania (regional unit)
Museums in Crete
Art museums and galleries in Greece